Ikualari is a mountain of the Kumaon Himalaya in Uttarakhand India. It is situated in the Nanda Devi range. It is 165th highest located entirely within the Uttrakhand. Nanda Devi, is the highest mountain in this category. It lies 2.7 km NW of Nanda Gond . Nital Thaur  lies 4.8 km SSE and It lies 3.5 km SSE of Kholi . Hardeol  lies 8.9 km west of it.

Climbing history
A group of Slovenian comprising Urban Golob, Boris Lorencic, Karel Zavrsnik and Matija Jost, reached Milam Glacier. Before attempting Hardeol they climbed Ikualari and Nital Thaur to acclimatize them self. They established two camps, first one at 4,600m on the upper glacier and second at 5,200m on the southwest ridge. On October 3 they reached the summit in three hours climbing from the second camp.  They repeated the same route which was done by the only previous ascent of this peak which was made by a team from Mumbai University in 1968 led by Prof. Chandekar.

Neighboring and subsidiary peaks
Neighboring or subsidiary peaks of Ikualari:
 Hardeol
 Kholi
 Nital Thaur 
 Nanda Gond 
 Darcho:

Glaciers and rivers
The nearby Glaciers are Ikualari Glacier, Billanlari Glacier, Surajkund Glacier all this glacier joins the main glacier Milam Glacier from there emerges the river Goriganga River that later joins the Kali River at Jauljibi.

See also

 List of Himalayan peaks of Uttarakhand

References

Mountains of Uttarakhand
Six-thousanders of the Himalayas
Geography of Chamoli district